Carlos Rivas (born, Oscar Weber, February 16, 1925 – June 16, 2003) was an American actor, best remembered as Lun Tha in The King and I (1956), Dirty Bob in True Grit (1969), and Hernandez in Topaz (1969).

Early life
Rivas was born in El Paso, Texas, to a German father and Mexican mother. English was his first language and he was also known as Oscar von Weber and Karl Weber.

Career
Carlos Rivas was discovered in a bar in Mexico. He began his career in Mexican and Argentinian westerns, though his Argentinian films were actually filmed in Mexico.

His American debut was in The King and I (1956) opposite Rita Moreno. After this career highlight, he was quickly reduced to supporting roles. That same year of 1956 he appeared as Johnny Bravo in the TV western Cheyenne in the episode titled "Johnny Bravo," and in the 1961 episode of Maverick titled "Poker Face" starring Jack Kelly. Rivas had co-starring roles in two science fiction films, The Beast of Hollow Mountain (1956) and The Black Scorpion (1957). Rivas played Chingachgook in The Deerslayer (1957) with Lex Barker, Forrest Tucker, and Rita Moreno.

In 1970, Rivas joined Ricardo Montalban, Henry Darrow, and other Latino actors in co-founding the Nosotros ("We") Foundation, a Los Angeles based organization devoted to improving the way Hispanics are depicted in entertainment and to advocating for Latinos in the movie and television industry.

Partial filmography

 A Life in the Balance (1955) - Police officer (uncredited)
 Amor en cuatro tiempos (1955) - Antonio del Río
 La vida tiene tres días (1955) - José
 Fury in Paradise (1955)
 De carne somos (1955) - Mario Vidal
 Comanche (1956) - Wounded Comanche (uncredited)
 The King and I (1956) - Lun Tha
 The Beast of Hollow Mountain (1956) - Felipe Sanchez
 The Big Boodle (1957) - Carlos 'Rubi' Rubin (uncredited)
 The Deerslayer (1957) - Chingachgook
 La ciudad de los niños (1957) - Padre Oliver
 The Black Scorpion (1957) - Artur Ramos
 Panama Sal (1957) - Manuel Ortego
 Livets vår (1958) - Folke Sundqvist (voice)
 Where Are Our Children Going? (1958) - Eduardo
 Machete (1958) - Carlos
 Pueblo en armas (1959) - Gorgonio
 Sonatas (1959) - Juan Guzmán
 The Miracle (1959) - Carlitos
 The Unforgiven (1960) - Lost Bird
 Yo sabia demasiado! (1960)
 The Dalton That Got Away (1960) - Grey Wolf
 ¡Viva la soldadera! (1960)
 Pepe (1960) - Carlos
 Mi guitarra y mi caballo (1961) - (uncredited)
 La máscara roja (1962) - Sebastián Carrillo
 Matar o morir (1963)
 They Saved Hitler's Brain (1963) (released 1968) - Camino Padua/Teo Padua
 Una cara para escapar (1963)
 Los viciosos (1962)
 El Club del clan (1964) - Chico Novarro (voice)
 Duelo de pistoleros (1966)
 Tarzan and the Valley of Gold (1966) - Romulo
 The Chinese Room (1968) - Nicolás Vidal
 Hang Your Hat on the Wind (1969) - Tall Bandit
 True Grit (1969) - Mexican Bob
 The Undefeated (1969) - Diaz
 Topaz (1969) - Hernandez
 The Phantom Gunslinger (1970) - Sam
 The Gatling Gun (1971) - Two-Knife
 Doc Savage: The Man of Bronze (1975) - Kulkan
 Tarjeta verde (1978)
 Young Rebels (1989) - Mr. Vincenzo
 Discriminación maldita (1990)
 Gas Food Lodging (1992) - Padre
 Mi Vida Loca (1993) - Sad Girl's Father

References

External links

1925 births
2003 deaths
20th-century American male actors
Male actors from El Paso, Texas
American people of German descent
American male actors of Mexican descent